Teeuinge is one of the principal Tewa Pueblo ancestral sites in New Mexico, US. It is situated in the southerly angle formed by the juncture of Rio Oso and Rio Chama. It is a large ruin situated on the rim of the mesa overlooking the valley, just below the confluence of the two rivers. The pueblo was constructed of adobe with some use of lava blocks in the foundation walls, and is now reduced to low mounds. It was built in two large adjoining quadrangles, or as one long rectangle divided by cross walls into two courts. Within and contiguous to the pueblo are ten circular, subterranean kivas. A few yards to the east is a ruined shrine in circular form,  in diameter, built of lava blocks set on edge.

References

Pueblo great houses
Archaeological sites in New Mexico
Puebloan buildings and structures
Native American history of New Mexico
Ruins in the United States
Former populated places in New Mexico
Tewa
Pueblos in New Mexico